Erich Wied (6 February 1923 – 28 September 1987) was a gymnast from Germany. Along with his twin brother, Theo, they competed at the 1952 and 1956 Summer Olympics in all artistic gymnastics events and finished in fourth and fifth place with the German team, respectively. Individually they performed best on the vault in 1956, with a 16th place for Erich and a fourth place for Theo.

References

1923 births
1987 deaths
German male artistic gymnasts
Gymnasts at the 1952 Summer Olympics
Gymnasts at the 1956 Summer Olympics
Olympic gymnasts of West Germany
Olympic gymnasts of the United Team of Germany
20th-century German people